Dennis Miller is a former American football coach. He served two stints as the head football coach at Wisconsin Lutheran College, from 2000 to 2012 and again from 2014 to 2019. Miller had a brief one-year retirement during the 2013 season.

Miller previously served as the head coach of Northern State University in Aberdeen, South Dakota from 1986 to 1997, leading a once-moribund team to national prominence and a playoff appearance in 1988.

As an assistant coach at Brigham Young University, Miller was part of the staff that won a national title in 1984.

Head coaching record

References

External links
 Wisconsin Lutheran profile

Year of birth missing (living people)
Living people
BYU Cougars football coaches
Northern State Wolves football coaches
St. Cloud State Huskies football coaches
St. Cloud State Huskies football players
Wisconsin Lutheran Warriors football coaches